In 1977 election to Bihar Vidhan Sabha Janata Party secured 214 out of total 325 seats. Karpoori Thakur was elected as leader of Janata party legislature defeating Janata party chief Satyendra Narain Sinha and was sworn in as the Chief Minister of Bihar on 17
June 1977. Here are names of the ministers:

Cabinet ministers
Karpoori Thakur - Chief minister
Kailashpati Mishra - second in command 
Jogeswar Mandal
Kapildeo Singh
Thakur Prasad
Anup Lal Yadav
Smt Sumitra Devi
Sacchidanand Singh - Irrigation Minister
Jabir Hussain - Health Minister
Thakur Muneshwar Singh - Energy and later Irrigation Minister
Samsher Jang Bahadur Singh - Labour Minister
Yadunath Baskey - Tribal Welfare Minister

References

1977 in India
Bihar ministries
Janata Party state ministries
1977 establishments in Bihar
Cabinets established in 1977